Kasi Viswanadha Veera Venkata Satyanarayana Reddy Kosuri is an Indian politician. He was elected to the Andhra Pradesh Legislative Assembly from Rampachodavaram in the 2009 Andhra Pradesh Legislative Assembly election as a member of the Indian National Congress.

References

1965 births
Living people
Indian National Congress politicians from Andhra Pradesh
Bharatiya Janata Party politicians from Andhra Pradesh
People from East Godavari district
Andhra Pradesh MLAs 2009–2014